Mayroyd is a hamlet in Hebden Bridge in West Yorkshire, England.  It consists of Mayroyd Hall, a Grade II listed building, an associated 17th century cottage (also a Grade II listed building) and Mews.

The first records on a building on the site of Mayroyd Hall was a farm-building called Thornhollin in 1399. By 1435, a larger manor house was established here by the name of Meherrode.

Mayroyd Hall itself was first built  in the 15th century, it was rebuilt following a fire.  The present building is an early 17th-century hall-and-cross-wing house. The oldest section of the house is Elizabethan, the more recent section is Georgian.  It is typical of manor houses in this part of Yorkshire with mullion windows.  The gardens have a number of examples of rare bee boles.

In the 16th and 17th century, the Hall was largely owned by either the Sutcliffe family and later the Cockcroft Family.

Members of the families who are recorded here have included
 John de Wethelay [1434]
 Robert de Southclyff [1435]
 John Sutcliffe [1500s]
 Robert Sutcliffe [1530]
 Matthew Sutcliffe an English clergyman, academic and lawyer who was born here about 1550  
 Adam Sutcliffe [1582]
 Brian Bentley [1584]
In the winter of 1643 when Yorkshire was largely the theatre of operations in the English civil war, Mayroyd was a stronghold for the royalists. At that time it belonged to the Cockcroft family, and in the 17th century, it was the home of William Cockcroft, Henry Cockcroft, William Cockcroft [1700], William Cockcroft, and Grace Cockroft [1745].

Several local attorneys – including Thomas Sayer and Robert Alcock - lived and practised here from the early 18th century.

Subsequent owners and tenants have included
 Rev John Crook [1834] who founded Hope Baptist Church in Hebden Bridge in 1858
 John Horsfall [1854] who founded the cloth factory at Calder Mill, John Horsfall & Sons
 James Sutcliffe-Thomas JP [1927]
 Sir Harold Sutcliffe [1950s] Conservative member of parliament

References 

Hamlets in West Yorkshire
Hebden Bridge